Las Piñas Baptist Academy is a Christian school in Las Piñas, Metro Manila, Philippines. The school offers ACE (Accelerated Christian Education) system.

Schools in Las Piñas
Educational institutions established in 1990
1990 establishments in the Philippines